Secret Story - Casa dos Segredos: Desafio Final 1 is the first all-stars season with housemates from Secret Story 2 & 3 of the Portuguese version of the reality show Secret Story, which based on the original French version and of Big Brother. The season started on 6 January 2013 and ended 22 days later with the final on 27 January 2013. The prize is €10,000.

Housemates

Alexandra
Alexandra Ferreira was a housemate in Secret Story 3. She entered the House on Day 1 and left on Day 15.
 Results:
 Secret Story 3: She was the 16th housemate to be evicted from Secret Story 3. She was the 2nd housemate to be evicted in a double eviction against Tatiana, Jean-Mark and Mara, with 34% of the votes to evict.
 Secret Story: Desafio Final: She was the female choice from the public, with 9% of the votes to enter. She walked, because she didn't want to continue without Wilson.

Carlos
Carlos Sousa was a housemate in Secret Story 2. He entered the House on Day 1 and left on Day 22.
 Results:
 Secret Story 2: He was the 7th housemate to be evicted from Secret Story 2. He was evicted against João J. and Marco, with 50% of the votes to evict.
 Secret Story: Desafio Final: He was the 5th Finalist in the Final of Secret Story: Desafio Final, with 5% of the votes to win.

Cátia
Cátia Palhinha was a housemate in Secret Story 2. She entered the House on Day 1 and left on Day 22.
 Results:
 Secret Story 2: She was Runner-Up in the Final of Secret Story 2, with 28% of the votes to win.
 Secret Story: Desafio Final: She was the Winner in the Final of  Secret Story: Desafio Final, with 56% of the votes to win.

Cláudio
Cláudio Viana Fernandes was a housemate in Secret Story 3. He entered the House on Day 1 and left on Day 8.
 Results:
 Secret Story 3: He was the 4th Finalist in the Final of Secret Story 3, with 10% of the votes to win.
 Secret Story: Desafio Final: He was the 2nd housemate to be evicted from Secret Story: Desafio Final. He was the 2nd housemate to be evicted in a double eviction against Susana and Ricardo, with 39% of the votes to evict.

Daniela
Daniela Pimenta was a housemate in Secret Story 2. She entered the House on Day 1 and left on Day 22.
 Results:
 Secret Story 2: She was the 12th housemate to be evicted from Secret Story 2. She was evicted against Daniela S., with 72% of the votes to evict.
 Secret Story: Desafio Final: She was the 6th Finalist in the Final of Secret Story: Desafio Final, with 2% of the votes to win.

Fanny
Fanny Rodrigues was a housemate in Secret Story 2. She entered the House on Day 1 and left on Day 22.
 Results:
 Secret Story 2: She was the 14th housemate to be evicted from Secret Story 2. She was evicted against João M., with 89% of the votes to evict.
 Secret Story: Desafio Final: She was the 4th Finalist in the Final of Secret Story: Desafio Final, with 8% of the votes to win.

Joana
Joana Pinto was a housemate in Secret Story 3. She entered the House on Day 1 and left on Day 17.
 Results:
 Secret Story 3: She was the 6th housemate to be evicted from Secret Story 3. She was evicted against Petra and Tatiana, with 84% of the votes to evict.
 Secret Story: Desafio Final: She was the 6th housemate to be evicted from Secret Story: Desafio Final. She was the 2nd housemate to be evicted in a double eviction against Ricardo and Sandra, with 21% of the votes to evict.

Marco
Marco Costa was a housemate in Secret Story 2. He entered the House on Day 1 and left on Day 22.
 Results:
 Secret Story 2: He was the 5th Finalist in the Final of Secret Story 2, with 7% of the votes to win.
 Secret Story: Desafio Final: He was the 3rd Finalist in the Final of Secret Story: Desafio Final, with 9% of the votes to win.

Nuno
Nuno Mota was a housemate in Secret Story 3. He entered the House on Day 1 and left on Day 15.
 Results:
 Secret Story 3: He was the 12th housemate to be evicted from Secret Story 3. He was evicted against Rúben and Jean-Mark, with 55% of the votes to evict.
 Secret Story: Desafio Final: He was the 3rd housemate to be evicted from Secret Story: Desafio Final. He was the 1st housemate to be evicted in a double eviction against Joana, Ricardo and Wilson, with 43% of the votes to evict.

Ricardo
Ricardo Azevedo was a housemate in Secret Story 2. He entered the House on Day 1 and left on Day 22.
 Results:
 Secret Story 2: He was the 9th housemate to be evicted from Secret Story 2. He was evicted against Miguel and Paulo, with 51% of the votes to evict.
 Secret Story: Desafio Final: He was Runner-Up in the Final of Secret Story: Desafio Final, with 20% of the votes to win.

Sandra
Sandra Costa was a housemate in Secret Story 3. She entered the House on Day 1 and left on Day 17.
 Results:
 Secret Story 3: She was the 8th housemate to be evicted from Secret Story 3. She was evicted against Mara and Ana, with 56% of the votes to evict.
 Secret Story: Desafio Final: She was the 5th housemate to be evicted from Secret Story: Desafio Final. She was the 1st housemate to be evicted in a double eviction against Joana and Ricardo, with 61% of the votes to evict.

Susana
Susana Fialho was a housemate in Secret Story 2. She entered the House on Day 1 and left on Day 8.
 Results:
 Secret Story 2: She was the 10th housemates to be evicted from Secret Story 2. She was evicted against Cátia, with 64% of the votes to evict.
 Secret Story: Desafio Final: She was the 1st housemate to be evicted from Secret Story: Desafio Final. She was the 1st housemate to be evicted in a double eviction against Cláudio and Ricardo, with 40% of the votes to evict.

Wilson
Wilson Teixeira was a housemate in Secret Story 3. He entered the House on Day 1 and left on Day 15.
 Results:
 Secret Story 3: He was ejected from Secret Story 3, for physical assault after he head butted Hélio.
 Secret Story: Desafio Final: He was the male choice from the public, with 34% of the votes to enter. He was the 3rd housemate to be evicted from Secret Story: Desafio Final. He was the 2nd housemate to be evicted in a double eviction against Joana, Nuno and Ricardo, with 35% of the votes to evict.

Houseguests

Diogo
Diogo Cruz is Fanny's ex-boyfriend. He enter the House on Day 8 and left on Day 15.

António
António Queirós was the Winner of Secret Story 1. He entered the House on Day 17 and left on Day 22.

Ivo
Ivo Silva was the 4th Finalist of Secret Story 1. He entered the House on Day 17 and left on Day 22.

Jade
Jade Carpinteiro was the 6th Housemate to be evicted from Secret Story 1. She entered the House on Day 17 and left on Day 22.

Vera
Vera Ferreira was the 3rd Finalist of Secret Story 1. She entered the House on Day 17 and left on Day 22.

Secrets
There are two secrets in the All-Stars season: House's secret and "A Voz"'s secret.

: First, the Housemates were able to discover "A Voz" secret. Then, when all were finalists, the pass to the Final was useless. So, "A Voz" called António, Ivo, Vera and Jade to discover "A Voz" secret. Vera was the first to discover "A Voz" secret and won €2,500.

Nominations table

: First, all housemates voted for two female housemates, face to face (that round is in bold). Susana received the most nominations and is the first nominated. Then, the female housemates voted in the diary room for two male housemates. Cláudio and Ricardo received the most nominations and are nominated with Susana.
: After the votes face to face, "A Voz" decided to give immunity to Fanny and Alexandra. Votes for Fanny and Alexandra were scrapped.
: "A Voz" decided to give immunity to Marco, because he is the male housemate with more green balls.
: "A Voz" decided to automatic nominate Joana, because she is the female housemate with more red balls.
: First, the female housemates voted for a male housemate, face to face (that round is in bold). Ricardo received the most nominations and is the second nominee (the first nominee is Joana, who was automatically nominated). Then, the male housemates voted for each other in the diary room. Wilson and Nuno received the most nominations and are nominated with Joana and Ricardo.
: "A Voz" decided to give immunity to Cátia, because she is the housemate with more green balls.
: First, all housemates voted for a male housemate, face to face (that round is in bold). Ricardo received the most nominations and is the first nominee. Then, all housemates voted for two female housemates, face to face. Joana and Sandra received the most nominations and are nominated with Ricardo. 
: For the final, the public voted for the housemate they want to win.

Nominations total received

Nominations: Results

: All Housemates from Secret Story 2 & 3 were up for eviction to decide who will enter in the House. The producers only revealed the Top 2.

Twists

Housemates vote
On Day 1, "A Voz" chose two housemates to enter: Joana (SS3) and Teresa (SS2). But, only one of them could enter. By a vote of 5-3, the housemates chose Teresa to enter. But, "A Voz" decided to do the opposite, and Joana entered to the House.

Fake Eviction
On Day 1, "A Voz" asked the housemates to vote to evict a male and a female. Then, the male and female housemates with the most votes would be evicted. Ricardo and Joana received the most votes, but they weren't evicted, as the nominations were fake. Wilson was immune and exempt to vote as he was in a Secret Room.

Balls
In the house is now a board. If the housemate pass the tasks, a green ball will be added. If the housemate disrespect "A Voz" instructions or fail in the tasks, a red ball will be added.

Awards
 Susana - She won a dinner in the Secret Room with Marco, because she was the housemate with more green balls.
 Cátia - She won €750 to go shopping, because she was the housemate with more green balls.
 Marco - He won immunity, because he was the male housemate with more green balls.
 Cátia - She won immunity, because she was the housemate with more green balls.

Other Awards
 Fanny - She won a cruise for two persons during 7 days in the Mediterranean Sea, for answer the hot phone.
 Sandra - She won a trip to Cape Verde for two persons during 7 days, for discover House's secret.
 Daniela & Joana - They won each, a weekend in a spa for 2 persons, for answer the hot phone.
 Nuno - He won €600 to go shopping in an electronics store, for answer the hot phone.

Penalties
 Joana - She was automatically nominated, because she was the female housemate with more red balls.

Live Eviction Show :Ratings

External links
 Official Website 

2013 Portuguese television seasons
Desafio Final 1